Penza Oblast (Penzenskaya oblast) is a federal subject of Russia (an oblast). Its administrative center is the city of Penza. As of the 2010 Census, its population was 1,386,186.

Geography

Main rivers

Penza Oblast has over 3000 rivers; the overall length is 15,458 km. The biggest rivers are:
Sura;
Moksha;
Khopyor.
Penza River gave its name to the city of Penza.

Fauna
There are 316 species of vertebrates within the region, including:
about 10 species of amphibians;
about 200 species of birds;
about 8 species of reptiles;
about 68 species of mammals (fox, rabbit, ferret, badger, squirrel).

Seven existing species of mammals were already acclimatized on land: the American mink, muskrat, raccoon dog, wild boar, Siberian roe deer, red deer and Sika deer. In parallel, work has been carried out to reintroduce the Forest-steppe marmot, the Eurasian beaver and the Russian desman (a species of mole that resembles a muskrat).

In the waters of Penza Oblast, there are about 50 species of fish. The largest body of water – the Sursko reservoir – is home to around 30 species. Commercial species include bream, silver bream, pikeperch, ide, and catfish. In the rivers and smalls pond dwell roach, perch, carp, and pike. The most valuable fish to be found in the natural waters is the sterlet.

Climate

History

The regional center of Penza was built in 1663 as a Russian fortress on the border of the Wild Fields, although evidence of the presence of more ancient settlements has been found in the modern city.

Penza Province was established within Kazan Governorate in 1718. It became a separate Penza Governorate on September 15, 1780, which existed until March 5, 1797, when it was dissolved and merged into Saratov Governorate. Penza Governorate was re-established on September 9, 1801 and existed until 1928. Between 1928 and 1937, the territory of the former governorate underwent a number of administrative transformations, ending up as a part of Tambov Oblast in 1937. On February 4, 1939, modern Penza Oblast was established by splitting it out of Tambov Oblast. In March 1939, the Penza Oblast Committee of the CPSU was formed, the first secretary of the committee being Alexander Kabanov.

Administrative divisions

Economy
Penza Oblast is part of the Volga economic region. The oblast is one of Russia's leading producers of wheat, rye, oats, millet, buckwheat, cereal and forage crops, vegetables, potatoes, mustard, and meat.

Politics

During the Soviet period, the high authority in the oblast was shared among three persons: The first secretary of the Penza CPSU Committee (who in reality had the biggest authority), the chairman of the oblast Soviet (legislative power), and the Chairman of the oblast Executive Committee (executive power). Since 1991, CPSU lost all the power, and the head of the Oblast administration, and eventually the governor was appointed/elected alongside elected regional parliament.

The Charter of Penza Oblast is the fundamental law of the region. The Legislative Assembly of Penza Oblast is the province's standing legislative (representative) body. The Legislative Assembly exercises its authority by passing laws, resolutions, and other legal acts and by supervising the implementation and observance of the laws and other legal acts passed by it. The highest executive body is the Oblast Government, which includes territorial executive bodies such as district administrations, committees, and commissions that facilitate development and run the day to day matters of the province. The Oblast administration supports the activities of the Governor who is the highest official and acts as guarantor of the observance of the oblast Charter in accordance with the Constitution of Russia.

Demographics

Population: 

Vital statistics for 2012
Births: 14 777 (10.8 per 1000)
Deaths: 20 419 (14.9 per 1000) 
Total fertility rate:
2009 - 1.38 | 2010 - 1.37 | 2011 - 1.36 | 2012 - 1.48 | 2013 - 1.49 | 2014 - 1.53 | 2015 - 1.55 | 2016 - 1.50(e)

Ethnic composition (2010):
Russians: 86.8%
Tatars: 6.4%
Mordvins: 4.1%
Ukrainians: 0.7%
Chuvash: 0.4%
Armenians: 0.3%
Others ethnicities: 1.3%
Additionally, 43,283 people were registered from administrative databases, and could not declare an ethnicity. It is estimated that the proportion of ethnicities in this group is the same as that of the declared group.
Births: 7,962 (Jan-July 2008)
Deaths: 13,608 (Jan-July 2008)

Religion

According to a 2012 survey, 62.9% of the population of Penza Oblast adheres to the Russian Orthodox Church, 2% are unaffiliated generic Christians, 1% are Orthodox Christian believers without belonging to churches or members of non-Russian Orthodox churches, and 7% are Muslims. In addition, 15% of the population declares to be "spiritual but not religious", 9% is atheist, and 3.1% follows other religions or did not give an answer to the question.

Culture and recreation

Tourism
Troitse-Scanov Convent
State Lermontov Museum and Reserve of Tarkhany

Notable people
 Vasily Klyuchevsky (1841–1911) — a leading Russian historian of the late imperial period.
 Aristarkh Lentulov (1882–1943) – a Russian avant-garde artist of Cubist orientation who also worked on set designs for the theatre.
 Yevgeny Rodionov (1977–1996) – a Russian soldier who was murdered in Chechen captivity for his refusal to convert to Islam and defect to the enemy side.
 Victor Skumin (1948–) – a Russian scientist  first describes "cardioprosthetic psychopathological syndrome", later known as Skumin syndrome, a form of anxiety suffered by recipients of artificial heart valves.
Natalya Starovoyt, actress of Penza Oblast Drama Theatre

See also
List of Chairmen of the Legislative Assembly of Penza Oblast

References

Notes

Sources

External links

Official website of Penza Oblast Government
Official website of Penza Oblast 
"PenzaNews" news agency

 
Oblasts of Russia
States and territories established in 1939